Lioptilodes rionegroicus is a species of moth in the genus Lioptilodes known from Argentina, Chile, and Peru. Moths of this species take flight in August and October–January and have a wingspan of approximately 18–20 millimetres.

References

Platyptiliini
Moths described in 1991